Shyamlal Yadav  (1 May 1927 – 6 May 2005) was an Indian politician. He was the Deputy Chairman of the Rajya Sabha and was Member of Parliament in the 8th Lok Sabha. Yadav represented the Varanasi constituency of Uttar Pradesh and was a member of the Indian National Congress (INC) political party.

Background
Yadav was born in Varanasi, Uttar Pradesh. Yadav was an advocate by profession. In his early years, he held various non-political posts.  He was Director, District Cooperative Development Federation (Varanasi); Member, UP Harijan Welfare Board and President, Uttar Pradesh Government Hindi Samiti. He has also been the President of All-India Yadav Mahasabha.

Politics

Shyamlal Yadav entered politics shortly after Indian Independence. During his political career, he served in Uttar Pradesh Legislative Assembly, Lok Sabha & the Rajya Sabha. He held several portfolios in Assembly, Lok Sabha & the Rajya Sabha.

Commonwealth Parliamentary Association

Yadav was a member of Indian Parliamentary Delegation to the 19th (1973) & 30th (1984) Commonwealth Parliamentary Conference that were held in London & Isle of Man respectively.

Inter-Parliamentary Conferences

Yadav also participated in the Inter-Parliamentary Conferences as a member of Indian Parliamentary Delegation. He attended 68th (1981) & 69th (1982) conferences held in Havana & Rome respectively.

Posts Held

See also

8th Lok Sabha
List of members of the Rajya Sabha
Politics of India
Parliament of India
Government of India
Varanasi (Lok Sabha constituency)
Commonwealth Parliamentary Association
Deputy Chairman of the Rajya Sabha

References 

India MPs 1984–1989
1927 births
2005 deaths
Rajya Sabha members from Uttar Pradesh
Indian National Congress politicians from Uttar Pradesh
People from Varanasi district
Lok Sabha members from Uttar Pradesh
Politicians from Varanasi
Members of the Uttar Pradesh Legislative Assembly
Deputy Chairman of the Rajya Sabha